John Desmond Forbes Anderson, 3rd Viscount Waverley (born 31 October 1949), is a British peer.

The son of the 2nd Viscount Waverley and his wife Lorna Ledgerwood, he was educated at Malvern College.

Lord Waverley was first married to Anne Suzette Davidson in 1969. He then married Ursula Helen Barrow in 1994.

He succeeded to his father's titles in 1990. He is one of the ninety hereditary peers in the House of Lords elected to remain after the passing of the House of Lords Act 1999, sitting as a crossbencher.

He takes a particular interest in the central Asian republics of Kazakhstan, Uzbekistan, Turkmenistan, Kyrgyzstan, and Tajikistan, and works as a consultant to the Middle East Consolidated Contractors Company (CCC). He has been honoured with a Yoruba Chieftaincy in Nigeria and received State decorations from Kazakhstan, Kyrgyzstan and Colombia.

Lord Waverley has set up the website Parliament Revealed, to explain the workings of the UK Parliament.

Arms

References

External links
 lordwaverley.com

1949 births
Living people
People educated at Malvern College
Crossbench hereditary peers
Viscounts Waverley

Hereditary peers elected under the House of Lords Act 1999